Jakub Kunvaldský (1528–1578) or Jakub Zežula (Zezhula) was a Czech Lutheran clergyman from Moravia, a pedagogist and editor of hymnals.

He worked among other places in Přerov and Starý Jičín.

He was the editor of the hymnals Písně chval Božských (Songs of Divine Worship, 1572) and Nešpor český (Czech Vesper, 1576). Both of them were printed in Olomouc.

Bibliography 
 Josef Jireček, Jakub Kunwaldský a jeho kancionál. Časopis Matice moravské, 1874.

Czech Lutheran clergy
16th-century Lutheran clergy
Czech male writers
1528 births
1578 deaths